The Tiki Formation is a Late Triassic (Carnian to Norian) geologic formation in Madhya Pradesh, northern India. Dinosaur remains are among the fossils that have been recovered from the formation, although none have yet been referred to a specific genus. Phytosaur remains attributable to the genus Volcanosuchus have also been found in the Tiki Formation.

The genera Tikiodon, Tikitherium and Tikisuchus and species Rewaconodon tikiensis, Hyperodapedon tikiensis and Parvodus tikiensis have been named after the Tiki Formation.

Fossil content 
The following fossils have been described from the formation:

Cynodonts

Other fossils

Reptiles 

 Colossosuchus techniensis
 Hyperodapedon huxleyi
 H. tikiensis
 Parasuchus hislopi
 Tikisuchus romeri
 Volcanosuchus statisticae
 Ornithischia indet.
 Phytosauria indet.
 Pseudosuchia indet.
 Sphenodontia indet.
 Theropoda indet.

Amphibians 
 Eodiscoglossus sp.
 Compsocerops tikiensis
 Metoposaurus sp.

Fish 

 Cladodus sp.
 Lissodus duffini
 Parvodus tikiensis
 Actinopterygii indet.
 Coelacanthidae indet.

Flora 

 Baiera sp.
 Dicroidium sp.
 Elatocladus sp.
 Lepidopteris sp.
 Pagiophyllum sp.
 Sphenobaiera sp.
 Xylopteris sp.
 Yabeiella sp.

Correlations 
The Tiki Formation is considered a temporal equivalent of the Lower Maleri Formation. The majority of the Tiki Formation correlates with the Ischigualasto Formation of Argentina, the upper part of the Santa Maria Formation, and the overlying lower Caturrita Formation of Brazil, the Isalo II Beds of Madagascar, Lossiemouth Sandstone of Scotland, and the lower Tecovas Formation of the Chinle Group of North America.

See also 
 List of dinosaur-bearing rock formations
 List of stratigraphic units with indeterminate dinosaur fossils

References

Bibliography 

 
 
 
 
  
 
 
 
 
 
 

Geologic formations of India
Triassic System of Asia
Triassic India
Carnian Stage
Norian Stage
Mudstone formations
Sandstone formations
Fluvial deposits
Lacustrine deposits
Paleontology in India
Formations